John Edward McElroy (24 March 1913 – 26 July 1958) was an Australian rules footballer who played with Carlton in the Victorian Football League (VFL) and Brunswick in the Victorian Football Association (VFA).

Family
The son of John Edward McElroy (1872–1937), and Sarah Jane McElroy (1890–1919), née Dunne, John Edward McElroy was born at Warracknabeal on 24 March 1913.

He married Alma Mary Harrison (1916–2001) on 27 March 1937.

Death
He died at Essendon, Victoria on 26 July 1958.

Notes

References
 
 World War Two Nominal Roll: Corporal John Edward McElroy (V311078), Department of Veterans' Affairs.
 World War Two Service Record: Corporal John Edward McElroy (V311078), National Archives of Australia.

External links 
 
 Jack McElroy's playing statistics from the VFA Project
 Jack McElroy's profile at Blueseum

1913 births
1958 deaths
Carlton Football Club players
Australian rules footballers from Victoria (Australia)
Brunswick Football Club players
People from Warracknabeal